The Red Robe sometimes translated as The Red Dress (French: La robe rouge) is a 1933 French drama film directed by Jean de Marguenat and starring Constant Remy, Suzanne Rissler and Marcelle Praince. It is based on a 1900 play by Eugène Brieux. The film's sets were designed by the art director Aimé Bazin.

Cast

References

Bibliography 
 Lucy Mazdon & Catherine Wheatley. Je T Aime... Moi Non Plus: Franco-British Cinematic Relations. Berghahn Books, 2010.

External links 
 

1933 films
French drama films
1933 drama films
1930s French-language films
Films directed by Jean de Marguenat
French films based on plays
Gaumont Film Company films
French black-and-white films
1930s French films